Kepler-160 is a main-sequence star approximately the width of our Galactic arm away in the constellation Lyra, first studied in detail by the Kepler Mission, a NASA-led operation tasked with discovering terrestrial planets. The star, which is very similar to the Sun in mass and radius, has three confirmed planets and one unconfirmed planet orbiting it.

Characteristics 
The star Kepler-160 is rather old, having no detectable circumstellar disk. The star's metallicity is unknown, with conflicting values of either 40% or 160% of solar metallicity reported.

Of this system (and all others) the Breakthrough Listen search for extraterrestrial intelligence found no potential technosignatures.

Planetary system 
The two planetary candidates in the Kepler-160 system were discovered in 2010, published in early 2011 and confirmed in 2014. The planets Kepler-160b and Kepler-160c are not in orbital resonance despite their orbital periods ratio being close to 1:3.

An additional rocky transiting planet candidate KOI-456.04, located in the habitable zone, was detected in 2020, and more non-transiting planets are suspected due to residuals in the solution for the transit timing variations. From what researchers can tell, KOI-456.04 looks to be less than twice the size of Earth and is apparently orbiting Kepler-160 at about the same distance from Earth to the sun (one complete orbit is 378 days). Perhaps most important, it receives about 93% as much light as Earth gets from the sun. Nontransiting planet candidate Kepler-160d has a mass between about 1 and 100 Earth masses and an orbital period between about 7 and 50 d.

See also 
 List of exoplanets discovered in 2014
 List of exoplanets discovered in 2020
 Kepler space telescope

References 

Planetary systems with two confirmed planets
Lyra (constellation)
456
Planetary transit variables
G-type main-sequence stars